Barry Johann Ronge (30 December 1947 – 3 July 2022) was a South African journalist, columnist, writer, broadcaster, movie reviewer and raconteur. He was one of the country's best-known movie critics as well as one of its most widely read (and discussed) columnists.

Early life 
Ronge was born in Hillbrow, Johannesburg, and grew up on the West Rand where he attended Florida Park High School. He completed his studies at the University of the Witwatersrand, after which he began a teaching career at St. John's College, followed by a ten-year stint as a lecturer in literature at the University of the Witwatersrand.

Career 
He later moved on to become a print and electronic journalist, specializing in the arts.

Ronge is best known for his Spit and Polish column in the Sunday Times, his movie reviews for the same newspaper, and his Sunday evening show on Radio 702. After writing for the Sunday Times for 27 years, he wrote his last column on 23 February 2014.  In 2015, the Sunday Times renamed its prize for South African literature to the Barry Ronge Fiction Prize.

Death 
He passed away in his hometown, Johannesburg, on 3 July 2022.

Books 
 Spit 'n Polish, 2006, Penguin Books SA,

Awards 
 Thomas Pringle Award for Reviews, English Academy of South Africa, 2005
 Barry Ronge Fiction Prize longlist.

References

External links 
 Barry Ronge's page at the Sunday Times
 Barry Ronge's page at 702

1948 births
2022 deaths
South African journalists
South African film critics
White South African people
University of the Witwatersrand alumni
People from Johannesburg